This is a list of honorary societies to which individuals are elected based on meritorious conduct.

Private academies and societies 
 American Philosophical Society
 Phi Alpha Theta
 Phi Beta Kappa Society
 Phi Theta Kappa

National academies

Brazil 
 Brazilian Academy of Sciences

Bulgaria 

 Bulgarian Academy of Sciences

People's Republic of China 
 Chinese Academy of Sciences
 Chinese Academy of Social Sciences
 Chinese Academy of Engineering

Croatia 

 Croatian Academy of Sciences and Arts

France 
 Institut de France, which groups five academies:
 Académie française
 Académie des inscriptions et belles-lettres
 Académie des sciences
 Académie des beaux-arts
 Académie des sciences morales et politiques

Georgia 
 Georgian Academy of Sciences

India 
 Ibn Sina Academy of Medieval Medicine and Sciences

Iran 
 Academy of Gundishapur
 Academy of Persian Language and Literature
 Imperial Iranian Academy of Philosophy
 Iranian Academy of Medical Sciences
 Academy of Sciences of Iran
 Iranian Academy of the Arts
 National Iranian Olympic Academy

Russia 
 Russian Academy of Science
 Russian Academy of Arts
 Russian Academy of Theatre Arts 
 Russian Academy of Music 
 Russian Academy of Architecture and Construction Sciences

Serbia 
 Serbian Academy of Sciences and Arts

Slovenia 
 Slovenian Academy of Sciences and Arts

Sweden 
 Swedish Royal Academies

Taiwan (Republic of China) 
 Academia Sinica

Thailand 
 The Royal Institute

United States 
 National Academy of Medicine
 National Academy of Sciences
 National Academy of Engineering
 Kohl McCormick Academy of Outstanding Educators

United Kingdom 
 Royal Society
 British Academy
 Royal Society of Medicine
 Royal Society of Arts

International academies 
 World Academy of Art and Science (WAAS)

See also 
 Lists of awards
 Fraternal and service organizations
 Service club

Lists of organizations
Lists of awards